Jayson Gainza (born April 27, 1980) is a Filipino actor, comedian, impersonator, host, entrepreneur and vlogger. He was the first runner-up (Second Big Placer) in Pinoy Big Brother, as he garnered 312,258 votes, equal to 27.5% of the total votes.

Gainza is best known for his impersonation of talk show host Boy Abunda as "Tito Bhoy Aboonduh", in the Banana Split segment NNNN: Ntertainment News Na Naman and Banana Nite segment Ihaw Na! (respective parodies of former television show SNN: Showbiz News Ngayon and former Bandila talk segment Ikaw Na!).

Following the conclusion of gag show Banana Sundae, he became the lead cast member of its considered successor Sunday 'Kada until it went on hiatus in 2021. Gainza is later reunited with Home Sweetie Home co-stars John Lloyd Cruz and Miles Ocampo in a GMA Network sitcom Happy ToGetHer. He continued appearing in more of GMA's programs and eventually signed a contract with its talent management arm Sparkle on November 22, 2022.

Gainza is currently serving as a co-host of noontime variety show TiktoClock, which he previously guested.

Filmography

Television

Digital

Movies

Awards and nominations

Music video appearances
 "Shopping" (Ryan Bang feat. Donnalyn Bartolome) with Aiko Climaco, Sunshine Garcia, Jef Gaitan, Mayumi Yokoyama, and Kristine Santamena

References

External links 
 
 Sparkle GMA Artist Center profile
 

1980 births
Living people
People from Batangas City
Male actors from Batangas
Participants in Philippine reality television series
Pinoy Big Brother contestants
ABS-CBN personalities
Star Magic
TV5 (Philippine TV network) personalities
GMA Network personalities
Filipino male television actors
Filipino male comedians
Filipino parodists
Filipino television presenters
Filipino television variety show hosts
21st-century Filipino businesspeople